

Wanilla is a locality in the Australian state of South Australia located on the southern end of Eyre Peninsula about  west of the state capital of Adelaide and about  north-west of the city of Port Lincoln.

The traditional owners of the land within Wanilla are the Nauo peoples.

Wanilla began as a town surveyed in 1882 by H.J. Cant and which was later gazetted as a government town.  The boundaries of the locality were created on 16 October 2003 for the “long established name.”

Wanilla is located within the federal Division of Grey, the state electoral district of Flinders and the local government area of the District Council of Lower Eyre Peninsula.

See also
Hundred of Wanilla

References

External links
Wanilla Community website

Towns in South Australia
Eyre Peninsula